Soufi is a surname. Notable people with this surname include:

 Ali Soufi, Iranian reformist politician
 Mahmoud Soufi (1971–2019), Qatari footballer
 Muhammad Soufi (1927–2018), former field marshal in the Syrian Army
 Nawal Soufi (born 1988), Moroccan-Italian social worker and human rights activist